The 2013–14 VfL Wolfsburg season was the 69th season in the club's football history.

In 2013–14 the club played in the Bundesliga, the top tier of German football. It was the club's 17th consecutive season in this league, having been promoted from the 2. Bundesliga in 1997.

The club also took part in the 2013–14 edition of the DFB-Pokal, where it reached the semi-finals before losing to Borussia Dortmund.

Review and events

Matches

Legend

Friendly matches

Bundesliga

League fixtures and results

League table

DFB-Pokal

Squad

Squad, appearances and goals

Notes
1.Kickoff time in Central European Time/Central European Summer Time.

Sources

External links
 2013–14 VfL Wolfsburg season at Weltfussball.de 
 2013–14 VfL Wolfsburg season at kicker.de 
 2013–14 VfL Wolfsburg season at Fussballdaten.de 

Wolfsburg
VfL Wolfsburg seasons